Wu Minfeng (born 24 January 1999) is a Chinese footballer currently playing as a midfielder for Jiangxi Beidamen.

Career statistics

Club
.

Notes

References

1999 births
Living people
Chinese footballers
Association football midfielders
China League One players
Guangdong South China Tiger F.C. players
Jiangxi Beidamen F.C. players